Desi Americans may refer to:

South Asian Americans
American-Born Confused Desi, South Asian Americans who were born or raised in the United States